Touchpaper or touch-paper is a slow-burning paper fuse treated with solution of potassium nitrate (or "saltpetre") used for lighting flammable or explosive devices such as fireworks.

Touchpaper may also refer to:
Touchpaper Television, part of RDF Media Group and producer of UK programmes such as Single-Handed and Sold, Julian Fellowes Investigates: A Most Mysterious Murder and Murderland
Touchpaper, a novel by Peter Tennant
Touchpaper, a 1984 album by English singer-songwriter Claire Hamill